John Cadwalader (April 1, 1805 – January 26, 1879) was an American lawyer, jurist, and politician who served as a United States representative from Pennsylvania and a United States district judge of the United States District Court for the Eastern District of Pennsylvania.

Education and career

Born on April 1, 1805, in Philadelphia, Pennsylvania, Cadwalader received a Bachelor of Arts degree in 1821 from the University of Pennsylvania and read law in 1825.

He entered private practice in Philadelphia from 1825 to 1855. He was Solicitor for the Second Bank of the United States in Philadelphia in 1830.

He was Vice Provost of the Law Academy of Philadelphia from 1833 to 1853. He was a Captain in the Pennsylvania State Militia in Harrisburg, Pennsylvania in 1844, which was called out for the Philadelphia Nativist Riots.

He was elected as a member of the American Philosophical Society in 1867.

Congressional service

Cadwalader was elected as a Democrat from Pennsylvania's 5th congressional district to the United States House of Representatives of the 34th United States Congress, serving from March 4, 1855, to March 3, 1857. He declined to be a candidate for renomination in 1856. He briefly resumed the practice of law in Philadelphia.

Federal judicial service

Cadwalader was nominated by President James Buchanan on April 19, 1858, to a seat on the United States District Court for the Eastern District of Pennsylvania vacated by Judge John K. Kane. He was confirmed by the United States Senate on April 24, 1858, and received his commission the same day. His service terminated on January 26, 1879, due to his death in Philadelphia. He was interred in Christ Church Burial Ground at the old Christ Church in Philadelphia. He was succeeded by Judge William Butler, who was nominated by President Rutherford B. Hayes.

Personal life and family

Cadwalader was the son of Mary (née Biddle) Cadwalader (1781–1850), of the Philadelphia Biddle family, and military leader Thomas Cadwalader (1779–1841). Among his siblings was General George Cadwalader. His paternal grandfather was General John Cadwalader and his great-grandfather was Dr. Thomas Cadwalader. His maternal grandfather, Clement Biddle, was also a military leader, having served under George Washington during the Revolutionary War.

Cadwalader first married Mary Binney (1805–1831), daughter of Horace Binney, an Anti-Jacksonian United States Representative known for his public speeches; he founded the Hasty Pudding Club at Harvard. Together, Mary and John had two daughters, Following his first wife's death from complications of childbirth, he married Henrietta Maria Bancker (1806–1889) with whom he had six children.

Through his eldest daughter Mary, Cadwalader was the grandfather of Mary Cadwalader Rawle (1850–1935), who was married on March 24, 1870 to Frederick Rhinelander Jones, the brother of Edith Wharton; their daughter in turn was landscape architect Beatrix Cadwalader Jones Farrand (1872–1959).

Cadwalader's grandson, John Cadwalader III (1874–1934), became trustee of the estate of his aunt Sophia Georgiana (née Fisher) Coxe (1841–1926) which funded the MMI Preparatory School.

References

External links
 The Cadwalader Family Papers, documenting the Cadwalader family through four generations in America, are available for research use at the Historical Society of Pennsylvania.
 

 

1805 births
1879 deaths
Biddle family
Judges of the United States District Court for the Eastern District of Pennsylvania
United States federal judges appointed by James Buchanan
19th-century American judges
Politicians from Philadelphia
American people of Welsh descent
Members of the Philadelphia Club
Democratic Party members of the United States House of Representatives from Pennsylvania
Burials at Christ Church, Philadelphia
19th-century American politicians
United States federal judges admitted to the practice of law by reading law
University of Pennsylvania alumni